Wizz Air as well as its subsidiaries Wizz Air Abu Dhabi, Wizz Air Malta, and Wizz Air UK operate flights to the following destinations.

List

Annotations

References

Wizz Air